Ivan "Ico" Hitrec (13 April 1911 – 11 October 1946) was a Croatian football player.

He was the first technical officer and in his office in the Zagreb power-works in Gundulićeva Street, the best players from Građanski met and discussed forming a new club with blue shirts which later became Dinamo Zagreb.

Club career
The centre-forward became a legend after scoring twice against then famous Spanish keeper Ricardo Zamora during the first night game in Zagreb between Zagreb and Madrid in 1931. As one of the first Croatian international players, he went on to play for Grasshopper of Switzerland, and "Kicker", at the time the foremost sports journal in Europe, chose him as a member of the European elite 11.

International career
Hitrec was a goal-scorer for the Kingdom of Yugoslavia national team. He appeared in 14 international games and scored 9 goals in 7 of them. He was one of seven Croatian players to boycott the Yugoslavian national team at the 1930 FIFA World Cup after the Football Association of Yugoslavia was moved from Zagreb to Belgrade. His final international was an October 1939 friendly match against Germany.

Style of play
Hitrec's play was characterized by excellent technique and dribbling skills. He was able to sprint 100 meters in under 12 seconds in football conditions making him one of the fastest footballers of the era. He was also known for very powerful kicks, and was quoted as saying jokingly that he did not like to perform 11 m penalty kicks because they were "too close" (to the goal). Severino Minelli, his Grasshopper teammate, reminisced about Hitrec: "I played many matches where Hitrec was brilliant, the best. But, above all, I remember his kicks. Frightful! Goalkeepers would move away from his balls, I'm not exaggerating, that's indeed how it was."

Honours

Grasshopper Club Zürich
Swiss Cup (1932)

HAŠK
Yugoslav First League (1937/1938)

References

External links
 

1911 births
1946 deaths
Footballers from Zagreb
Association football forwards
Yugoslav footballers
Yugoslavia international footballers
HAŠK players
Grasshopper Club Zürich players
Yugoslav First League players
Yugoslav expatriate footballers
Expatriate footballers in Switzerland
Yugoslav expatriate sportspeople in Switzerland
Burials at Mirogoj Cemetery